Gabon women's national basketball team is the nationally basketball team representing Gabon at world basketball competitions for women.

Outlook
The Gabonese played in July 2021 in Kinshasa a pivotal match against the DR Congo national team at the 2021 Women's Afrobasket qualification under head coach Raymond Lasseny.
 
At that time, the Gabonese had always beaten the RDC.

Results

African Championship
 2005 : 9th
 2015 : 7th

See also
Gabon women's national under-19 basketball team

References

External links
FIBA profile
Presentation on Afrobasket.com 
Gabon Basketball Federation Presentation on facebook
Gabon Basketball Records at FIBA Archive

 
Women's
Women's national basketball teams